Tornasi is an ethnic group in Sudan. They speak Kelo, a Nilo-Saharan language. Its  ISO 639-3 code is xel. It has 200 speakers. It is among the Satellite-Core languages among the Nilo-Saharan languages. A more detailed division is Core languages, then Eastern Sudanic languages, Southern languages, Eastern Jebel languages, then Aka-Kelo-Molo. Their language is critically endangered. Beni Sheko speakers consider themselves to be part of the same ethnic group as Kelo speakers. They live in Geissan District, Blue Nile State, Sudan: Jebel Tornasi, Keeli village, and Beni Sheko. They live West of Berta-speaking people.

References

External links
Joshua Project

Ethnic groups in Sudan